The Indiana High School Boys Basketball Tournament, organized by the Indiana High School Athletic Association (IHSAA), is  one of the oldest state high school basketball tournament in America. The tournament has often featured future NCAA and National Basketball Association (NBA) players. The Milan Miracle team in the 1953–54 season inspired the 1986 movie Hoosiers.  In the early 1920s, the tournament was dominated by the Franklin Wonder Five, who won three consecutive state championships, followed by a college championship at Franklin College. They won several games against professional teams. 

Beginning with the 1997–98 season, the IHSAA divided Indiana high schools into four classes based on enrollment, and each class held its own tournament.

List of champions

Team championships by year

Beginning in the 1997-98 season, a class system was implemented under which four championships are awarded yearly.

Footnotes

References 
 IHSAA Boys Basketball State Champions
 IHSAA Boys Basketball Most State Championships 
 Greg Guffey, The Greatest Basketball Story Ever Told: The Milan Miracle (2003)
 Greg Guffey, The Golden Age of Indiana High School Basketball (2006)
 Zak Keefer, History of our Hysteria: How Indiana fell in love with basketball, IndyStar, March 16, 2014
 Bob Williams, Hoosier Hysteria! (1997)

See also
 Hoosier Hysteria
 Indiana Basketball Hall of Fame

External links
 IHSAA Boys Basketball

High school sports in Indiana
Basketball in Indiana
High school basketball competitions in the United States